Breton Sound is a sound of the Gulf of Mexico and a part of the coastline of the U.S. state of Louisiana. It lies off the southeast coast of the state and is partially enclosed by the Breton Islands.

Two ships in the United States Navy have been named the USS Breton after this area.

On August 29, 2005, Hurricane Katrina crossed the sound before making its third landfall near Pearlington, Mississippi.

External links
Environmental Atlas of Lake Pontchartrain
Phytoplankton of the Breton Sound estuary

Bodies of water of Louisiana
Bodies of water of Plaquemines Parish, Louisiana
Bodies of water of St. Bernard Parish, Louisiana
Sounds of the United States
Estuaries of Louisiana